Poland competed in the Junior Eurovision Song Contest 2022, which was held on 11 December 2022 in Yerevan, Armenia. Polish broadcaster Telewizja Polska (TVP) is responsible for the country's participation in the contest, and chose the Polish artist and song through the national selection .

Background 

Olivia Wieczorek was selected to represent the nation that year with the song "". Olivia finished in 11th place out of 17 entries with 60 points. In , Alicja Rega was selected to represent Poland with the song "". She finished 8th out of 16 entries with 138 points. In , Sara James competed for Poland with the song "Somebody" which ended up in 2nd place out of 19 entries with 218 points, being 6 points short of winning the competition.

Before Junior Eurovision

National final 
Polish broadcaster TVP will once again select the Polish representative through a special edition of the television programme  under the name Szansa na sukces. Eurowizja Junior 2022. The same procedure was also used for the Junior Eurovision Song Contest from 2019 to 2021, and in 2020 for the Eurovision Song Contest. Szansa na sukces will, once again, consist of four shows: three semi-finals broadcast on 4 September, 11 September and 18 September, and a final on 25 September. Seven singers, as determined after the auditions held 14 and 15 May in Warsaw, will perform songs that will be drawn randomly in each semi-final, with one (traditionally, up to two finalists might be picked as a wildcard) qualifying for the final as determined by a jury of artists.

Semi-final 1 
The first semi-final was broadcast on 4 September 2022. The topic of the episode was "international hits". A honourable mention and the winner were determined by a jury panel consisting of: Cleo (singer, Polish representative in the Eurovision Song Contest 2014), Sara James (singer, runner-up in the Junior Eurovision Song Contest 2021) and Marek Sierocki (Polish commentator of the Junior Eurovision Song Contest). For the first time in the history of the show, the ability to pick a Golden Ticket finalist was used to select Laura Bączkiewicz as the second finalist of the episode.

Semi-final 2 
The second semi-final was broadcast on 11 September 2022. The topic of the episode was "the Polish Junior Eurovision". Two honourable mentions and the winner were determined by a jury panel consisting of: Lanberry (singer-songwriter, composer of the Polish songs in the Junior Eurovision Song Contest 2018 and 2019), Viki Gabor (winner of the Junior Eurovision Song Contest 2019) and Marek Sierocki.

Semi-final 3 
The third semi-final was broadcast on 18 September 2022. The topic of the episode was "the huge hits of the Eurovision Song Contest". The winner was determined by a jury panel consisting of: Ala Tracz (Polish representative in the Junior Eurovision Song Contest 2020), Michał Wiśniewski (Polish representative in the Eurovision Song Contest 2003 and 2006, as part of Ich Troje), Ida Nowakowska (co-host of the Junior Eurovision Song Contest 2019 and 2020) and Marek Sierocki.

Final 
The final took place on 25 September 2022. In the first round, all contestants performed songs from the semi-final they took part in. 2 artists qualified to the second round based on a 50/50 combination of votes from a jury and public vote. In the second round, the artists performed original songs. The winner was in a 50/50 split of jury and public vote. The jury consisted of three members: Konrad Smuga (director of Polish performances at Junior Eurovision), Grzegorz Urban (music director of Szansa na Sukces), and Anna Cyzowska-Andura (director of the TVP Entertainment Agency). Another jury consisting of Rafał Brzozowski (co-host of the Junior Eurovision Song Contest 2020, Polish representative in the Eurovision Song Contest 2021), Viki Gabor and Marek Sierocki provided feedback in regards to the songs during the show, but had no voting power. In addition to the performances of the competing entries, Viki Gabor performed her new single "Barbie" as the interval act.

At Junior Eurovision 
After the opening ceremony, which took place on 5 December 2022, it was announced that Poland would perform second on 11 December 2022, following the Netherlands and preceding Kazakhstan.

Voting

Detailed voting results

References 

Poland
Junior Eurovision Song Contest